James or Jim Jensen may refer to:

James A. Jensen (1918–1998), paleontologist, known as Dinosaur Jim
James H. Jensen (1864–1943), Wisconsin state assemblyman
James Jensen (The Sadhu), character in The Sadhu
Jim Jensen (reporter) (1926–1999), American TV journalist
Jim Jensen (wide receiver) (born 1958), known as "Crash" Jensen
Jim Jensen (Nebraska politician) (born 1934), Nebraska state senator
Jim Jensen (running back) (born 1953), running back who mostly played for the Denver Broncos